In organic chemistry, thiocarboxylic acids are organosulfur compounds related to carboxylic acids by replacement of one of the oxygen atoms with a sulfur atom. Two tautomers are possible: a thione form and a thiol form. These are sometimes also referred to as "carbothioic O-acid" and "carbothioic S-acid" respectively. Of these the thiol form is most common (e.g. thioacetic acid).

A naturally occurring thiocarboxylic acid is pyridine-2,6-dicarbothioic acid, a siderophore.

Synthesis
Thiocarboxylic acids are typically prepared by salt metathesis from the acid chloride, as in the following conversion of benzoyl chloride to thiobenzoic acid using potassium hydrosulfide according to the following idealized equation:
C6H5C(O)Cl + KSH -> C6H5C(O)SH + KCl

Reactions
At neutral pH, thiocarboxylic acids are fully ionized. Thiocarboxylic acids are about 100 times more acidic than the analogous carboxylic acids. For PhC(O)SH pKa = 2.48 vs 4.20 for PhC(O)OH.  For thioacetic acid the pKa is near 3.4 vs 4.72 for acetic acid.

Their conjugate bases, e.g. potassium thioacetate, serve as reagents for installing thiol groups via the displacement of alkyl halides to give the thioester, which in turn are susceptible to hydrolysis.

Thiocarboxylic acids react with various nitrogen functional groups, such as organic azide, nitro, and isocyanate compounds, to give amides under mild conditions. This method avoids needing a highly nucleophilic aniline or other amine to initiate an amide-forming acyl substitution, but requires synthesis and handling of the unstable thiocarboxylic acid. Unlike the Schmidt reaction or other nucleophilic-attack pathways, the reaction with an aryl or alkyl azide begins with a [3+2] cycloaddition; the resulting heterocycle expels N2 and the sulfur atom to give the monosubstituted amide.

Dithiocarboxylic acids
Dithiocarboxylic acids, with the formula , are less common than the monothio derivatives. They are about 3x more acidic than the monothiocarboxylic acids. Thus, for dithiobenzoic acid pKa = 1.92. Such compounds are commonly prepared by the reaction of carbon disulfide with a Grignard reagent:
RMgX + CS2 -> RCS2MgX
RCS2MgX + HCl -> RCS2H + MgXCl
This reaction is comparable to the formation of carboxylic acids using a Grignard reagent and carbon dioxide. Dithiocarboxylate salts readily S-alkylate to give dithiocarboxylate esters:
RCS2Na + R'Cl -> RCS2R' + NaCl

Aryldithiocarboxylic acids, e.g., dithiobenzoic acid, chlorinate to give the thioacyl chlorides.

See also
 Thioester
 Thiocarbamate
 Thiocarbonate
 Thiocarbonic acid
 Thiocarbonate

References

 

Organic acids
Reagents for organic chemistry
Organosulfur compounds
Functional groups